This is a list of states in the Holy Roman Empire beginning with the letter S:

References

S